Live and Rare may refer to:

Live and Rare (Faster Pussycat EP)
Live and Rare (Helmet album)
Live and Rare (Jane's Addiction album)
Live and Rare (My Chemical Romance EP)
Live & Rare (Korn album)
Live & Rare (Rage Against the Machine album)
Live & Rare (Reagan Youth album)
Live & Rare Volume 1, an album by Quiet Riot
The Berzerker – Live and Rare
Limited Live & Rare, an album by Ammonia
In the End: Live & Rare, an EP by Linkin Park
Rare and Live Tracks, an album by 10 Years